Kirsty Mackay is a Scottish documentary photographer living in Bristol. Her first book is My Favourite Colour Was Yellow (2017). In 2017 Mackay won the Rebecca Vassie Memorial Award.

Life and work
Mackay was born in Glasgow. She studied photography at Glasgow College before leaving for New York City and London, to work as a photographer's assistant. She gained an MA in Documentary Photography from the University of Wales, Newport.

Mackay's first photo-book, the self-published My Favourite Colour Was Yellow (2017), documents the bias for the colour pink amongst girls in the UK.

In 2017 Mackay won the Rebecca Vassie Memorial Award, mentoring and a bursary of £1250 to help in making her project The Fish that Never Swam. The award is to help early-career photographers develop their careers. Mackay's project is in response to the Glasgow effect, "the impact housing and overcrowding has on the life expectancy of Glaswegians".

Publications
My Favourite Colour Was Yellow. Self-published, 2017. With an essay by Jo B. Paoletti, "Generation Pink". Edition of 200 copies. .
The Fish That Never Swam. Self-published, 2021. With an abridged version of the "History, politics and vulnerability: explaining excess mortality" report by the Glasgow Centre for Population Health. Edition of 500 copies. .

Awards
2017: Rebecca Vassie Memorial Award

References

External links 

Year of birth missing (living people)
Living people
Photographers from Glasgow
Scottish women photographers
Documentary photographers
Alumni of the University of Wales, Newport
Women photojournalists